The welfare of farmed insects concerns treatment of insects raised for animal feed, as food or pet food, and other purposes such as honey and silk.

Debate over the issue's significance

Scientists remain uncertain about the existence and degree of pain in invertebrates, including insects. Nonetheless, insect welfare is being taken increasingly seriously in laboratory settings.  Vincent Wigglesworth suggested a precautionary approach of anaesthetizing insects during potentially painful procedures. John Cooper has written about techniques for "Anesthesia, analgesia, and euthanasia of invertebrates" including insects. Neil A. C. Bennie and colleagues proposed a method for chemical euthanasia of insects and other terrestrial arthropods.

Some authors have begun extending discussions of insect welfare beyond the laboratory to the domain of raising insects for food. The Dutch Animal Act, which went into effect on 1 January 2013, created a regulatory framework for farm-animal welfare based on the five freedoms, and the law specifically lists a number of insect species as "production animals" whose wellbeing needs to be respected. Dutch politician Marianne Thieme asked a series of questions suggesting concern that insect farming would multiply the number of animals farmed and killed for human consumption. Robert Nathan Allen of the pro-entomophagy organization Little Herds feels that the welfare of insects is important, though he believes well managed farms can maintain high standards of care. Some entomophagy suppliers highlight the importance of humane insect treatment. For instance, World Ento uses the name "Good Karma Killing" to describe its process of freezing insects into a stasis state. A 2013 FAO report on "Edible insects" includes a section encouraging high standards of welfare in entomophagy operations, despite uncertainty about whether insects can suffer.

Others feel that considering the wellbeing of farmed insects is going too far. Rhys Southan suggests that even most vegans do not care a lot about insects, but that "Insects are to animal rights what Larry Flynt is to the First Amendment—you have to uphold their rights even if you don't want to, or the whole thing falls apart." He goes on to propose satirical slogans that insect-rights activists might use against entomophagy.

Welfare considerations for rearing 

Because there is little standardized protocol for insect rearing, most farmers learn the best production methods by trial and error. For instance, if they kill an insect colony by setting the temperature too high, they avoid doing that in the future. Most breeders keep their techniques secret in order to avoid having them copied by other farms.

Because there are so many types of insects, it is not feasible to devise a single protocol for their treatment. Case-by-case understanding is required.

Disease 

When viruses infect an insect-rearing facility, they spread rapidly and kill most of the insects.

Humans can spread diseases to farmed insects. Thus, sanitation is very important, and only farm staff should have access to the insects. For instance, the company Van de Ven had a pathogen outbreak that killed all of its Zophobas morio worms, and the breeders hypothesized that the disease may have been brought by human visitors.

Giving insects a heat gradient may sometimes help prevent disease because behavioral thermoregulation can suppress pathogens.

Humidity 

Walter Jansen's Jagran company raises housefly larvae for use as animal feed. Humidity needs to be carefully controlled to avoid dehydrating or drowning the insects.

Temperature 

Insects are poikilothermic, but maintaining an adequate temperature range remains important. For example, mealworms thrive best when living close together, but this can lead to overheating if temperature is not controlled.

Cannibalism 

Some insects like locusts begin eating each other when they become overcrowded or malnourished. Adequate space and nutrition are important to prevent this.

Slaughter methods

Developing world

Entomophagy is common in many developing countries, such as Thailand and Mexico. Usually killing is done without euthanasia. For instance:

 Termites are either eaten alive directly where they're found or are brought home to be roasted over coals or fried.
 Cicadas are boiled, fried, or sautéed.
 Water bugs may be eaten whole, steamed, fried, or roasted and canned.
 Scorpions are skewered alive and fried in oil.
 Tarantulas are fried in oil or roasted over a fire.
In Silveiras, Brazil, residents pluck the wings off ants and then either fry them or dip them in chocolate. In Thailand, crickets are gathered fresh in the morning and then fried.

Industrial farms

Little research has been done on humane methods of killing insects for consumption.

The most common killing methods used by entomophagy companies in the Netherlands are freezing and dry-freezing (i.e., freezing and reducing pressure in order to extract water from the insects).

Protix Biosystems kills its black soldier flies by shredding, since its end product is a powder. Death takes less than a second. Tarique Arsiwalla at Protix said shredding makes sense because Western consumers are more likely to accept powdered insects than whole insects.

The Jagran company has tried asphyxiation, cooling, freeze-drying, boiling, and shredding. Managing Director Walter Jansen believes that shredding is most humane.

The Kreca company kills its animal-feed insects by putting them into a fridge or freeze-drying them. Insects destined for human consumption are first sterilized in hot water and then are refrigerated or freeze-dried.

FAO's "Edible insects" report suggests: "Insect-killing methods that would reduce suffering include freezing or instantaneous techniques such as shredding."

Freezing

While freezing is sometimes said to be a humane way to kill certain arthropods, others dispute this. According to "AVMA Guidelines for the Euthanasia of Animals", freezing is "not considered to be humane" when not preceded by another form of anesthesia. The British and Irish Association of Zoos and Aquariums (BIAZA) Terrestrial Invertebrate Working Group (TIWG) reports on a survey conducted by Mark Bushell of BIAZA institutions. He found that refrigeration and freezing were the most common methods "of euthanasia of invertebrates although research has suggested that this is probably one of the least ethical options." That said, freezing is a worst-case method if chemical or instantaneous physical destruction is not possible.

Hobbyist entomophagy

Some "how to" guides for eating insects make no mention of freezing or other euthanasia methods. For example, Miles Olson recommends
 suffocating or roasting ants
 decapitating, gutting, and then stewing, roasting, or sautéing slugs
 steaming and slicing snails
 frying, roasting, toasting, suffocating, or drowning crickets
 drowning, squeezing, and then stir frying or stewing earthworms
 eating aphids raw
and so on.

The website Insects Are Food suggests refrigerating insects to slow them down without killing them, prior to boiling or otherwise cooking them.

Other guides recommend freezing first. Timothy Ferriss recounts what he observed when roasted his insects without freezing them first: "Suffice it to say, merely sedated crickets make horrible noises if you roast them, and the visual is far, far worse. Do yourself a favor and freeze them."

Live insect feed

Sometimes insects are not killed by farming companies but are sold live, for consumption by fish and pets. 95% of the Kreca company's insects are sold live. Of the 1500 kg per week of mealworms produced by the Van de Ven company, most are sold as live feed.

Many suppliers of insects for reptiles offer live bugs and worms. Monitor lizards are typically fed live insects and may not eat pre-killed ones. Amphibians typically require live insects—wild-caught, home-grown, or bought at a pet store—although some like axolotls can be fed chunks of meat. It is generally hard to convert reptiles and amphibians that eat insects to pre-killed prey, though some pet owners can feed dead insects by moving or dangling them. Bearded dragons can be fed dead crickets by hiding them in other food, dangling them with tongs, squirting them with water, or vibrating a bowl.

Pet spiders, praying mantids, and other insectivorous bugs typically require live food. Hedgehogs can be fed live, freeze-dried, or canned insects.

Live worms and insects are commonly used as fishing bait, with the result that they are either eaten alive by fish or drowned.

Farmed insects not used for protein 

Many vegans avoid honey and silk because these require insect farming, even though the insects are not eaten. Silk production involves boiling silk worms alive in their cocoons.

The red pigment carmine is produced from powdered bodies of scale insects, so some vegans avoid it.

Shellac is produced from a resin secreted by the lac bug on specific trees in Asia. In addition to its use in industry, shellac is incorporated into some fruits, coffee beans, and candies as confectioner's glaze. Some vegans avoid confectioner's glaze because lac bugs may be killed during shellac production. Lac used to produce red dye may be even more injurious to lac bugs because while shellac comes from lac-bug secretions, lac dye's color comes from the insect bodies themselves.

See also

 Insect euthanasia

Notes

Insect farming
Insects as food
Animal welfare